The Craig retroazimuthal map projection was created by James Ireland Craig in 1909. It is a modified cylindrical projection. As a retroazimuthal projection, it preserves directions from everywhere to one location of interest that is configured during construction of the projection. The projection is sometimes known as the Mecca projection because Craig, who had worked in Egypt as a cartographer, created it to help Muslims find their qibla. In such maps, Mecca is the configurable location of interest.

Given latitude φ to plot, latitude φ of the fixed location of interest, longitude λ to plot, and the longitude λ of the fixed location of interest, the projection is defined by:

But when λ − λ = 0, y above is undefined, so instead use the ratio's continuous completion:

See also

List of map projections
Hammer retroazimuthal projection

References

Further reading

External links
An interactive Java Applet to study the metric deformations of the Craig Projection.
Biography of James Ireland Craig (1868-1952).

Map projections
Salah